Anthony III the Studite or Antony III Studites, (died April or May 981) was a Greek monk and the Ecumenical Patriarch of Constantinople from 974 to 979. He died in Constantinople.

References 

981 deaths
10th-century patriarchs of Constantinople
Studite monks
Year of birth unknown